, also known as QAB, is a Japanese broadcast network affiliated with the ANN. Their headquarters are located in Okinawa Prefecture.

QAB has a relationship with Ryukyu Broadcasting, a Japan News Network affiliate, as the headquarters of RBC and QAB are both located in the same building in Naha City.

Overview
QAB was the first commercial TV station to open in Okinawa Prefecture after its reversion to Japan in 1972, and is also one of the new Heisei stations. Since the main station was the first UHF TV station in the prefecture (UHF channel 28 in Naha), a new UHF antenna was required in some areas to watch the station. For this reason, for several years after the start of test broadcasts, a 5-minute program "アンテナ情報" (literally "Antenna Information") was broadcast to explain how to install the antenna (In areas that receive relay stations other than the Naha main station, there are already UHF relay stations at other locations, and most households have UHF antennas, so it was possible to watch by setting the channel on the TV itself).

RBC has invested in the company and shares the RBC building (floors 2 and 6 of the RBC Hall), so many employees and staff are seconded from RBC. This is based on the business alliance between RBC and TV Asahi, which was concluded on the premise of the friendship between the Okinawa Times and the Asahi Shimbun, which have a close relationship with RBC, and the opening of the station. QAB conducts part of the broadcasting operations related to announcements, reporting, and sales in-house, and outsources most of the broadcasting operations to RBC, including facility management of company buildings and transmission stations, and transmission masters. In effect, RBC has one station and two waves, and it is positioned as the second channel of RBC TV. Initially, QAB sought to integrate RBC and the news department, but it was postponed due to the possibility of conflict with the JNN exclusive agreement of "not allowing participation of broadcasting stations belonging to other networks". Initially, TV Asahi was planning to open the station alone, but RBC, who was afraid of collapsing together, negotiated with TV Asahi and tenaciously negotiated with the Ministry of Posts and Telecommunications (at that time) to build the current system.

There was a possibility of simultaneous opening with fourth Okinawan station (UHF channel 30, Nansei Broadcasting, a station that was planned to be affiliated with Nippon TV in Okinawa Prefecture), which was planned in the 1990s.

Only TVQ Kyushu Broadcasting, affiliated with TV Tokyo in Fukuoka Prefecture, uses the abbreviation "Q". The logo has a Latin letter 'A' inside the '\' part of a 'Q' shaped like a satellite dish.

There are no Nippon Television affiliated stations and TV Tokyo affiliated stations in Okinawa Prefecture, but the main station does not broadcast Nippon Television affiliated programs. On the other hand, TV Tokyo affiliated programs, programs of the affiliated stations of JAITS, and programs of the production committee method are partly broadcast in the form of program sales.

History
10 June 1994: QAB is founded.
1 October 1995: It started as Okinawa Prefecture's third commercial television station station (test broadcasts from September 24 to 30 that year).
1 December 2006: the station's Digital terrestrial television broadcasts were started from their Naha main station.
21 October 2009: Although it was initially not applicable, broadcasting started in the Sakishima Islands (Miyako/Yaeyama), which was shifted to the opening of a new digital station. At first, preparations were made with the aim of opening the station in May of the same year, but the cause was a malfunction in the equipment connecting the transmission line between the main island and the Sakishima Islands and the signal transmission line within the Sakishima Islands. Postponement announced on the 28th. After that, the problem with the equipment was fixed, and on October 20th, the Okinawa Telecommunications Office issued a license, and in the Sakishima (Miyako/Yaeyama) area, QAB was finally able to be viewed 15 years after the station opened.
23 July 2011: Broadcasting started in the Daito Islands (Minamidaito/Kitadaito) as a new digital station. This covers 99.5% of the entire Okinawa Prefecture.

Coverage area

Digital(ID:5)
Naha(Main Station) JORY-DTV 16ch
Ginowan 46ch
Goya 33ch

Analog 
Until July 24, 2011, when the signal ended
Naha(Main Station) JORY-TV 28ch
Ginowan 35ch
Goya 18ch
Gushikawa 44ch
On'na 35ch
Nakijin42ch
Motobu 54ch
Kumejima 42ch

Programs
QAB News (weekdays 11:42-11:45am, Mondays and Thursdays 7:54-8pm)
ちゃ～たいむ("Chat Time", Fridays 10:20-10:45am)
CATCHY (Mon-Fri 4:15-4:45pm part 1; 6:15-6:55pm part 2, local news program before and after Super J Channel)
The Challenge! (Mondays 12:20-1:30am)
17のたね (17 Seeds, Tuesdays 6:55-7pm)
Ryunetsu Game TV (Wednesdays 6:55-7pm)
ハングリーナ (Hangrina, Thursdays 6:55-7pm)
OKINAWA Sunrise Town TV (Thursday 23:10 - 23:15)
Ryukyu Island Travelogue (Friday 18:55 - 19:00)
Gourmet Chanpuru (1st and 3rd Friday of the month, 11:10-11:15pm, gourmet travelogue program, since February 2, 2002)
めざせ甲子園 (Mezase Koshien, Saturdays 5:00-5:30pm only during the summer high school baseball prefectural tournament)
Uchina Namba 1 (Sunday 10-10:30am, starting April 2010)
Saturday Kings (Saturday 10:50-11:05)
Kokizami Plus (Saturday 24:00 - 24:30)
お笑いバイアスロン (Comedy Biathlon, broadcast on a special program around the end of August every year, broadcast days and times vary depending on the year, held since 2013)
Okinawa Now (Filler program after the end of the regular broadcast. Mainly music and environmental images. With the start of this program, it became the first TV station in Okinawa with all-night regular broadcasts. However,  It may be suspended irregularly (not necessarily late at night on Sunday) due to the renewal of master equipment or large-scale repair work at the head office concert hall and Kakazu transmitting station, or due to adjustment of master equipment or other small-scale repair work in the head office. In this case, both data broadcasting and EPG are not available.)
Nippon Sake Series (Broadcast every December. Co-produced with KFB, UX, abn, HAB, OAB, KAB, the producing station varies from year to year.)

Rival stations
Okinawa Television (OTV)
Ryukyu Broadcasting Corporation (RBC)
NHK Okinawa

External links
QAB's official website

All-Nippon News Network
Asahi Shimbun Company
Television stations in Japan
Mass media in Okinawa Prefecture
Companies based in Okinawa Prefecture
Television channels and stations established in 1995
Mass media in Naha